This is a list of the 17 members of the European Parliament for Austria in the 2009 to 2014 session. One person from Alliance for the Future  and one from Social Democratic Party entered the Parliament in December 2011, bringing the number of MEPs to 19.

Lists

Footnotes

External links
European Parliament in Austria website with results, accessed 21 June 2009
Article about the two new MEP's ,accessed 13 December 2010 -Wiener Zeitung

2009
Austria
List